Hystrichopsyllidae is a family of fleas in the order Siphonaptera. There are at least 40 genera and 610 described species in Hystrichopsyllidae.

Genera

References

Further reading

 
 
 
 
 

 
Insect families